Kelley–Fredrickson House and Office Building, also known as the Arthur Fredrickson House and Candy Store, is a historic home and commercial building located at South Bend, St. Joseph County, Indiana. The house was built in 1892, and is a -story, irregular plan, Queen Anne style frame dwelling. Two additions were constructed between 1898 and 1917. It features a polygonal corner tower with a conical roof multiple porches with Stick Style ornamentation, bay and oriel windows, and a variety of decorative siding elements.  The office / store was built in 1892, and is a -story wood-frame building on a brick foundation.  The house was moved to 702 W. Colfax in 1986 and is operated as a bed and breakfast.

It was listed on the National Register of Historic Places in 1984.

References

Bed and breakfasts in Indiana
Houses on the National Register of Historic Places in Indiana
Commercial buildings on the National Register of Historic Places in Indiana
Houses completed in 1892
Commercial buildings completed in 1892
Buildings and structures in South Bend, Indiana
Houses in St. Joseph County, Indiana
National Register of Historic Places in St. Joseph County, Indiana